Personality development encompasses the dynamic construction and deconstruction of integrative characteristics that distinguish an individual in terms of interpersonal behavioral traits. Personality development is ever-changing and subject to contextual factors and life-altering experiences. Personality development is also dimensional in description and subjective in nature. That is, personality development can be seen as a continuum varying in degrees of intensity and change. It is subjective in nature because its conceptualization is rooted in social norms of expected behavior, self-expression, and personal growth. The dominant viewpoint in personality psychology indicates that personality emerges early and continues to develop across one's lifespan. Adult personality traits are believed to have a basis in infant temperament, meaning that individual differences in disposition and behavior appear early in life, potentially before language of conscious self-representation develop. The Five Factor Model of personality maps onto the dimensions of childhood temperament. This suggests that individual differences in levels of the corresponding personality traits (neuroticism, extraversion, openness to experience, agreeableness, and conscientiousness) are present from young ages.

Theories 

The development of personality is supported and attempted to be explained by theories of personality.

Psychoanalytic Theory 
The Psychoanalytic Theory of personality was developed by Sigmund Freud. This theory consists of three main ideas that make up personality, the id, the ego, and the superego. The three traits control their own sections of the psyche. Personality is developed by the three traits that make up the Psychoanalytic theory conflicting.

Trait Theory 
The Trait Theory of personality is one of the main theories in the study of personality. According to this theory, traits make up personality. Traits can be described as patterns of behavior, thought, or emotion. Some commonly accepted trait theories are the Big Five personality traits and the HEXACO model of personality structure. Generally, strong correlations are seen in the levels of any given personality trait in an individual when they are retested several years later. Traits tend to become more stable after young adulthood, and changes in these traits often follow some noticeable trends with age. For example, the trait Honesty-Humility is typically seen to decrease during teenage years, then steadily rise as the individual ages. The trait conscientiousness is generally seen to increase with age, however, the level of the facet perfectionism stays fairly consistent.

Social Cognitive Theory 
The social cognitive theory of personality views personality development in terms of reciprocal interactionism, that is, a perspective that considers the relationship of person-society as an interactive system that defines and molds personal development. Personal interaction with other individuals, society, and nature create experiences in which self-identification is organized in relation to social environment. In other words, personality traits are a function of complex cognitive strategies used to effectively maneuver through social situations. Furthermore, according to the social-cognitive perspective, cognitive processes are central to an individual's unique expression of personality traits and affective processes. Through cognitive mechanism and social competencies, individuals interpret contextual situations to derive beliefs that guide their thoughts and behaviors, thus developing an enduring pattern of personality traits.

Evolutionary Theory Humanistic Theory 
The evolutionary theory of personality development is primarily based on the evolutionary process of natural selection. From the evolutionary perspective, evolution resulted in variations of the human mind. Natural selection refined these variations based on their beneficence to humans. Due to human complexity, many opposing personality traits proved to be beneficial in a variety of ways. Primitive humans were collectivists due to tribe culture. The personalities of individuals within a tribe were very similar. The division of labor resulted in differentiation in personality traits in order to achieve a higher efficiency. Differentiation in personality traits increased functionality, therefore becoming adaptive through natural selection. Humans continued to develop personality and individuality through evolution.

Lifespan Theory 
Classic theories of personality include Freud's tripartite theory and post-Freudian theory (developmental stage theories and type theories) and indicate that most personality development occurs in childhood, stabilizing by the end of adolescence. Current lifespan perspectives that integrate theory and empirical findings dominate the research literature. The lifespan perspectives of personality are based on the plasticity principle, the principle that personality traits are open systems that can be influenced by the environment at any age. Large-scale longitudinal studies have demonstrated that the most active period of personality development appears to be between the ages of 20–40. Although personality grows increasingly consistent with age and typically plateaus near age 50, personality never reached a period of total stability.

Humanistic Theory 

Humanistic psychology emphasizes individual choices as voluntary actions that ultimately determine personal development. Individual personalities traits, although essential to the integrated self, are only parts that make up the whole of observable human experiences. Thus, personality development is articulated in terms of purposeful action geared towards experiencing mastery of free choice. Rather than compartmentalized elements of personality traits such as feelings, thoughts, or behavior, Humanistic psychology integrates these elements as functions of being in a greater encompassing system such as societies, cultures, or interpersonal relationships. Consequently, personality development is subjected to shifts in personal meaning and individual goals of achieving an ideal self.

Influencing factors
Personality traits demonstrate moderate levels of continuity, smaller but still significant normative or mean-level changes, and individual differences in change, often late into the life course. This pattern is influenced by genetic, environmental, transactional, and stochastic factors.

Genetics
Twin and adoption studies have demonstrated that the heritability of personality traits ranges from .3-.6, with a mean of .5, indicating that 50% of variation in observable personality traits is attributable to genetic influences. In contrast, family and adoption studies have demonstrated a low heritability factor of .22. A study conducted on German women using an IAT (implicit association test), shows a connection between the function of specific neurotransmitters and the predisposition to have certain personality traits like anxiety or extraversion. With the effects of genetic similarity removed, children from the same family often appear no more alike than randomly selected strangers; yet, identical twins raised apart are nearly as similar in personality as identical twins raised together. These findings suggest is that shared family environment has virtually no effect on personality development, and that similarity between relatives is almost entirely due to shared genetics.

Environmental
The weakness of shared environmental effects in shaping personality surprised many psychologists, spurring research into non-shared environmental effects, the environmental influences that distinguish siblings from one another. The non-shared environment may include differential treatment by parents, individually-distinct reactions to the shared family environment, peer influences, experiences outside the family, and test error in measurement. In adults, the non-shared environment may also include the unique roles and environments experienced after leaving the family of origin. Further effects of environment in adulthood are demonstrated by research suggesting that different work, marital, and family experiences are associated with personality change; these effects are supported by research involving the impact of major positive and negative life events on personality.

Gene-environment interactions
A culmination of research suggests that the development of personality occurs in relation to one's genetics, one's environment, and the interaction between one's genetics and environment. Van Gestel and Van Broeckhoven (2003) write, “Almost by definition, complex traits originate from interplay between (multiple) genetic factors and environment.” The corresponsive principle of personality development states that “life experiences may accentuate and reinforce the personality characteristics that were partially responsible for the particular environmental elicitations in the first place”. This principle illustrates how gene-environment interactions maintain and reinforce personality throughout the lifespan. Three main types of gene-environment interactions are active (the process by which individuals with certain genotypes select and create environments that facilitate the expression of those genotypes), passive (the process by which genetic parents provide both the genes and the early environmental influences that contribute to the development of a characteristic in their children), and reactive (the process by which non-family individuals respond to the behavior produced by a genotype in characteristic ways).

An example of the way environment can moderate the expression of a gene is the finding by Heath, Eaves, and Martin (1998) that marriage was a protective factor against depression in identical twins, such that the heritability of depression was as low as 29% in a married twin and as high as 51% in an unmarried twin.

Stability of personality 
Over the course of an individual's lifespan, the stability of their personality has been shown to be variable, although this variability levels out in adulthood. Behavioral genetics can account for the variability experienced across the lifespan. This is highly evident in the transitions between childhood, adolescence, and adulthood. From childhood to mid-adolescence, the rate of individual differences in personality increases, primarily due to environmental influences. However, genetic influences play a larger role than environmental influences in adulthood, resulting in fewer individual differences in personality between individuals who share similar genetics. The stability of personality across one's lifespan is further evidenced by a longitudinal study conducted on individuals across the span of fifty years from adolescence through adulthood. The results of this longitudinal study suggested that the personality was malleable, although variations in the level of malleability stabilized in adulthood.

A study published in the Journal of Personality and Social Psychology examined personality developing in college students based on the Big Five personality trait domains and facets within those domains. The results suggested that the rank-order stabilities of facets were high, with values greater than .50 (indicating a strong correlation); the results for trait domains were similar to individual facets. High rank-order stability is further evidenced by another study that integrated personality structure, process, and development. This study included previous research that indicated high-order rank stability; it also included research that indicated variation in this stability across periods of the lifespan, such as adolescence and adulthood. The stability and variation of personality is explained by a complex interaction between one's genetics and one's environment.

References 

Personality
Personal development